Quichotte can refer to:

 Don Quixote, novel written by 17th Century Spanish writer Miguel de Cervantes.
 Don Quichotte chez la Duchesse, comic ballet composed by Joseph Bodin de Boismortier, based on the novel by Cervantes.
 Quichotte (album), 1980 album by Tangerine Dream, later released as "Pergamon".

 Quichotte (novel), 2019 novel by author Salman Rushdie

See also
 Don Quixote (disambiguation)